Many notable politicians, entertainers, and figures in United States history are alumni of Loyola University in New Orleans, Louisiana. These include former members of the United States House of Representatives, members of the Louisiana House of Representatives and Louisiana State Senate, high-ranking Presidential United States Cabinet officials, a former head of state, a recipient of the Presidential Medal of Freedom, and numerous music celebrities, including opera star Norman Treigle. The university is also home to a number of high-profile professors, including Walter Block, the free market economist and anarcho-capitalist associated with the Austrian School. This is a list of notable people associated with the university.

Academics
 John Biguenet, Robert Hunter Distinguished Professor
 Walter Block, Harold E. Wirth Eminent Scholar Chair in Economics and Professor of Economics
 Sanford Hinderlie, Conrad N. Hilton Chair of Music Industry Studies at Loyola University New Orleans, educator, jazz pianist, composer, record producer
 Patrick R. Hugg, John J. McAulay Distinguished Professor of Law. 
 Angel Adams Parham, Associate Professor of Sociology 
 William P. Quigley, law professor and Director of the Law Clinic and the Gillis Long Poverty Law Center
 Ed Renwick, political science professor and CBS News contributor
 Ronal W. Serpas, professor at Loyola; Superintendent of the New Orleans Police Department, 2010–2014
 Harry Shearer, professor, longtime voice actor for The Simpsons
 Lowell C. Smith, Dean of the College of Business Administration
 Bernard J. Ward, '44 & '49, longtime professor at Loyola, Notre Dame Law School, and University of Texas School of Law; renowned expert in federal judiciary and federal procedure
 Reverend Kevin Wildes, S.J., Ph.D., President of Loyola; expert in the field of bioethics

Arts
 Chris Donahue '83, Academy Award-winning film producer
 Amy Guidry, '98, painter

Science
 Carl H. Brans, '57, physicist and co-developer of the Brans–Dicke theory of gravitation
 Donald Wetzel, '51, inventor of the ATM

Education
 Norman Francis, L'55, president of Xavier University of Louisiana and recipient of the Presidential Medal of Freedom

Politics
 Ben Bagert, '68, member of both houses of the Louisiana State Legislature, 1970–1992
 Larry S. Bankston, '76 Law, Louisiana state senator from Baton Rouge, 1988–1996
 Charles Emile "Peppi" Bruneau, Jr., New Orleans attorney; member of the Louisiana House of Representatives, 1976–2007
 Joseph Cao, former U.S. representative for Louisiana's 2nd congressional district in the United States House of Representatives
 Dan Claitor, '87 Law School graduate, member of the Louisiana State Senate from Baton Rouge
 Hezekiah Leonard Clark, Jr., Democratic Executive Committee, District "E", and President of the 9th Ward Citizen Voters League of New Orleans, Louisiana; United States Marine Corps sharpshooter, triple distinguished shooter: Rifle, Pistol and International; Master Shooter, the highest rating of the National Rifle Association
 Edwin Compass, '00, '02, Superintendent, New Orleans Police Department
 Patrick Connick, '83, state representative from Jefferson Parish
 James R. Domengeaux, former member of the United States House of Representatives from Lafayette.
 Jim Donelon, former state representative and current state insurance commissioner
 Hunt Downer, '72, former Speaker of the Louisiana House of Representatives; assistant adjutant general of the Louisiana National Guard
 Adrian G. Duplantier, L '49, former State Senator in the Louisiana State Legislature and Federal Judge of the United States District Court for the Eastern District of Louisiana
 Manuel A. Esquivel, '62, former Prime Minister of Belize
 Olaf Fink, Master's degree, member of the Louisiana State Senate, 1956–1972; New Orleans educator 
 C.B. Forgotston, former New Orleans resident, attorney, political activist, and fellow of the Loyola Institute of Politics
 Garey Forster, former state representative and state labor secretary, fellow of Institute of Politics
 Charles Foti, L, former Attorney General of Louisiana
 Kim Gandy, L '78, President of the National Organization for Women
 Ray Garofalo, current District 103 member of the Louisiana House of Representatives
 James Garvey, Jr. B.B.A.'87; Law '91, Metairie lawyer/accountant; member of the Louisiana Board of Elementary and Secondary Education since 2012
 Terry W. Gee, Master's in Business, member of the Louisiana House of Representatives for Jefferson and Orleans parishes, 1980–1992; taught for seven years at Loyola 
 E. W. Gravolet, member of both houses of the Louisiana legislature from Plaquemines Parish
 Charles Grisbaum, Jr., B '59, L '61, state representative and state appeals court judge for Jefferson Parish
 Anthony Guarisco, Jr., 12-year state senator from Morgan City; law school graduate in 1966
 William J. Guste, attorney general of Louisiana, 1972–1992; instrumental figure in the Carter-Mondale election of 1976
 Paul J. Hardy, attorney and former Lieutenant Governor of Louisiana
 Cynthia Hedge-Morrell, member of the New Orleans City Council, 2005–2014; retired educator
 Nita Rusich Hutter, Class of 1974, Louisiana state representative from St. Bernard Parish
 Ed Karst, controversial mayor of Alexandria (1969–1973)
 Raymond Laborde, '49, mayor of Marksville (1958–1970), state representative (1972–1992), commissioner of administration (1992–1996)
 Mitch Landrieu, L'85, Mayor of New Orleans; Lieutenant Governor of Louisiana(2006–2010); candidate for the 2006 New Orleans Mayoral Election
 Moon Landrieu, '52, L'54, former mayor of New Orleans; former Secretary of the U.S. Department of Housing and Urban Development; former Louisiana Fourth Circuit Court of Appeals Judge
 Jeff Landry, Law, Republican member of the United States House of Representatives from Louisiana's 3rd congressional district, elected 2010
 Oscar M. Laurel, '41, Mexican-American politician in south Texas
 Harry Lee, L'67, former Sheriff of Jefferson Parish
 Tony Ligi, Law, State representative from Jefferson Parish since 2008
 Joseph Lopinto, B.A. and Law, member of the Louisiana State House from Jefferson Parish
 Danny Martiny, Law, member of the Louisiana State Senate from Jefferson Parish
 A.J. McNamara, Law, member of the Louisiana House (1976–1980), U.S. District Judge (1982–2001)
 Edwin R. Murray, '82, L'85, member of the Louisiana State Senate
 Sean O'Keefe, '77, former National Aeronautics and Space Administration (NASA) Administrator; former Louisiana State University Chancellor; former United States Secretary of the Navy
 Paul Pastorek, B.A. '76 Law '79, Louisiana state superintendent of education, 2007–2011
Vance Plauché, '18, member of the United States House of Representatives from Lake Charles, 1941–1943
 Julie Quinn, Law, attorney and member of the Louisiana State Senate from Jefferson Parish since 2005
Dan Richey, '75, former member of the Louisiana House of Representatives and Louisiana State Senate and Republican political activist
 John R. Smith, member of both houses of the Louisiana State Legislature since 1988, Leesville businessman
 Elmer R. Tapper, '52, former member of the Louisiana House of Representatives from St. Bernard Parish
 Ray Tarver, Dentistry '52, member of the Louisiana House from Natchitoches Parish, 1964–1968
 Suzanne Haik Terrell, L'84, former Louisiana Commissioner of Elections; Republican councilwoman in the New Orleans City Council; special adviser to President George W. Bush in the Economic Development Administration
 Steve Theriot, Accounting, state representative, legislative auditor
 Richard Alvin Tonry, '67, former member of the United States House of Representatives from Louisiana's 1st congressional district
 Mack A. "Bodi" White, Jr., state representative from East Baton Rouge Parish
 Robert Wilkie, L'88, former Assistant Secretary of Defense and Special Assistant to the President for National Security Affairs
 J. Skelly Wright ('32, L'34), former U.S. Court of Appeals for the District of Columbia Judge, who is famous for ordering the desegregation of Louisiana schools and college during the Civil Rights Movement

Sports
 Zeke Bonura, Major League Baseball player
 Lloyd Bourgeois, Olympic track and field member
 Bernard S. Flint, Thoroughbred racehorse trainer
 Eddie Flynn, boxer
 Bucky Moore, American football player
 Richie Petitbon, American football player and coach
 Sammis Reyes (MBA 2018), basketball player who later converted to American football and became the first Chilean to play in the NFL
 Michael Smith, host of ESPN's Numbers Never Lie and His and Hers
 Emmett Toppino, Olympic track and field gold medalist

Law
 Pascal F. Calogero, Jr., '54, former Chief Justice of the Louisiana Supreme Court
 Adrian G. Duplantier, '49, federal judge and former Louisiana state senator
 Jeannette Knoll, '66, associate justice of the Louisiana Supreme Court
 Michael H. O'Keefe, '55, Louisiana State Senate President; convicted felon
 Carl E. Stewart, '74, Chief Judge, U.S. Court of Appeals for the Fifth Circuit
 Chet D. Traylor, '74, Associate Justice of the Louisiana Supreme Court, 1997–2009

Journalism
 Andrew Callaghan, journalist, host of Channel 5 and former host of All Gas No Brakes
 Michelle Lima, ABC News anchor and reporter
 Tom Llamas, ABC News anchor and correspondent
 Susan Vollenweider, Co-Host of The History Chicks podcast on Wondery, freelance writer and columnist for Kansas City Star

Entertainment
 Royd Anderson, '98, documentary filmmaker
Brent Crayon, 1995, American pianist and musical director
 Charles Anthony, tenor
 Maria Celeste Arraras, Telemundo presenter
 Mia Borders, 2010, singer-songwriter
 Paul Bouche, '91 TV producer, host, comedian, A Oscuras Pero Encendidos
 Wanda Brister, mezzo-soprano
 Elise Cambon, pedagogue
 Harry Connick, Jr., award-winning jazz singer, pianist, and humanitarian
 Kyan Douglas, television personality and grooming expert
 Ruth Falcon, '64, soprano and pedagogue
 G-Eazy, born Gerald Gillum, rapper
 Victor Goines, jazz saxophonist and clarinetist
 Greer Grimsley, bass-baritone
 Bryan Hymel, tenor
 Anthony Laciura, '74, tenor and actor
 Rick Margitza, tenor saxophonist, played with the Maria Schneider Orchestra
 Ellis Marsalis, '86, jazz pianist and recording artist
 Victor J. Montilla, '98, president, Puerto Rico Corporation of Public Broadcasting
 Jim Paratore, television producer and executive (The Ellen DeGeneres Show), co-creator of TMZ
 Beth Patterson, '93, Irish and Celtic musician and producer
 Marguerite Piazza, '40, soprano and entertainer
 Natalia Rom, soprano
 Jason Root, '09, GRAMMY winner and 25-time nominee for A&R Production
 Biff Rose, '55, comedian and artist
 Audrey Schuh, '50, soprano
 Harry Theyard, '57, tenor
 Mary Tortorich, '42, pedagogue
 Norman Treigle, '51, bass-baritone
 Phyllis Treigle, '81, soprano
 Aristos Petrou, musician
 Peter Martin, musician and TikTok personality known as Petey

Business
 Tom Benson, '48, owner of the New Orleans Saints and Fox Broadcasting Company affiliate WVUE-DT
 Philip J. Carroll, '58, former CEO of Shell Oil; appointed in 2003 by President George W. Bush to head the policy planning advisory board of the Iraqi Oil Ministry

Photo gallery

References

Loyola University New Orleans
Loyola University New Orleans people
New Orleans-related lists